Paulo Dias de Novais (c. 1510 – 9 May 1589), a fidalgo of the Royal Household, was a Portuguese colonizer of Africa in the 16th century and the first Captain-Governor of Portuguese Angola. He was the grandson of the explorer Bartolomeu Dias.

Dias arrived in what is now Angola on 11 February 1575. Attracted by the prospect of the famous silver mines of Cambambe, he founded the settlement of São Paulo de Luanda, near the island of Luanda. He became the first governor of Angola on 19 September 1571.

References 

Portuguese explorers
Explorers of Africa
Governors of Portuguese Angola
1510 births
1589 deaths
Portuguese city founders
Portuguese colonial governors and administrators
1570s in Angola
Portuguese Angola
16th-century explorers
16th-century Portuguese people
Jewish Angolan history